Miloš Stojčev (born 19 January 1987) is a Serbian professional footballer who plays for Grafičar Beograd as a midfielder.

Club career

Europe
Born in Serbian capital, Belgrade, Stojčev started playing football in the youth teams of Serbian giants and ex-European champions Red Star Belgrade. In 2006, he joined Serbian SuperLiga squad of FK Bežanija, another club from the capital Belgrade. The following season he signed for the famous Novi Sad club FK Vojvodina where he had little chances to show all his capacities and played only eight games without scoring a goal. Another Superliga club, FK Borac Čačak was his next challenge. In his first season there he got to be quite an influential player, having played 26 Superliga matches scoring one goal, and having the opportunity to play in the UEFA Cup where his team, after beating FC Dacia Chişinău and Lokomotiv Sofia in the previous rounds, lost to Ajax. While with Borac Čačak he appeared in 58 league matches and scored 2 goals, playing primarily as a left midfielder.

North America
In February 2011 he went on trial at Sporting Kansas City. After impressing during his trial stint, he was signed by Sporting on 16 March 2011. He made his debut for his new team on 19 March 2011 in their first game of the 2011 MLS season, a 3-2 win over Chivas USA.

Sporting Kansas City waived Stojčev on November 23, 2011

Return to Europe
He joined FC Akzhayik for the 2012 season. He then played for Premier League of Bosnia and Herzegovina side FK Leotar. He returned to the  Kazakhstan Premier League playing for Atyrau.

He joined Sarajevo for the 2013-14 season.

Sarajevo midfielder Stojčev told SDNA that he wants to clinch his potential transfer to Atromitos soon. Atromitos are in negotiations with Sarajevo over the transfer of the 28-year-old midfielder to reinforce their squad further in the middle of the park. Stojcev wants to see this transfer completed as soon as possible and speaking to SDNA the 28-year-old midfielder confirmed his wish to join the Greek club. “I'm one and a half year at Sarajevo and I think that this is the time to make the next move in my career. Atromitos are very interested and personally I want to play at this club and in the Greek Super League. I'm an important member of Sarajevo squad, however I'm 28 years old and my club has promised not to prevent me from playing at a higher level in my career. I know that the offer has been described as not good enough but I hope that a deal can be reached soon,” Stojcev told SDNA.
On 10 February 2016, thanks to an excellent strike by Stojcev, Atromitos won 1-0 against Panathinaikos and advanced to Greek Cup semi finals, after first leg's goalless draw.

On 31 August 2017, Stojčev signed a year contract with Platanias F.C. for an undisclosed fee.
On 12 April 2018, due to imminent demotion to Football League, the experienced midfielder was released from struggling Platanias, even before the end of 2017-18 Super League.

On 4 June 2018, Stojčev signed a two year contract with newly promoted Premier League of Bosnia and Herzegovina club FK Tuzla City, at that time still known by the name of "FK Sloga Simin Han". He scored his first goal for Tuzla on 13 April 2019, in a 1–1 home draw against FK Radnik Bijeljina.

In June 2019, Stojčev signed a contract with Serbian SuperLiga club FK Voždovac.

Career statistics

Honours
Sarajevo
Bosnian Premier League: 2014–15
Bosnian Cup: 2013–14

References

External links
Miloš Stojčev at Soccerway

1987 births
Living people
Footballers from Belgrade
Serbian people of Montenegrin descent
Association football midfielders
Montenegrin footballers
Montenegro under-21 international footballers
Red Star Belgrade footballers
FK Sopot players
OFK Grbalj players
FK Bežanija players
FK Vojvodina players
FK Borac Čačak players
Sporting Kansas City players
FC Akzhayik players
FK Leotar players
FC Atyrau players
FK Sarajevo players
Atromitos F.C. players
Veria F.C. players
Platanias F.C. players
FK Tuzla City players
FK Voždovac players
Serbian SuperLiga players
Major League Soccer players
Kazakhstan Premier League players
Premier League of Bosnia and Herzegovina players
Super League Greece players
Montenegrin expatriate footballers
Expatriate footballers in Serbia
Montenegrin expatriate sportspeople in Serbia
Expatriate soccer players in the United States
Montenegrin expatriate sportspeople in the United States
Expatriate footballers in Bosnia and Herzegovina
Montenegrin expatriate sportspeople in Bosnia and Herzegovina
Expatriate footballers in Kazakhstan
Montenegrin expatriate sportspeople in Kazakhstan
Expatriate footballers in Greece
Montenegrin expatriate sportspeople in Greece